Molėtai is a town in north eastern Lithuania surrounded by lakes. One of the oldest settlements in Lithuania, it is a popular resort for the inhabitants of Vilnius. According to the 2013 census, it had 6,302 inhabitants.

History
It was first mentioned as a private property of the bishop of Vilnius in year 1387.

On August 29, 1941, 700 to 1,200 Jews were murdered in a mass execution perpetrated by an Einsatzgruppen of Lithuanian "nationalists". The victims of the massacre were commemorated in a march to the site, and a memorial was unveiled there, on the 75th anniversary, in 2016.

In modern times the city has Molėtai Astronomical Observatory, the only such facility in Lithuania. And Lithuanian Museum of Ethnocosmology - the first such type of museum in the world.

Gallery

References

External links

 Molėtai tourist information centre (Places of interest)
 Virtual Tour of Molėtai
  Town's homepage
 The murder of the Jews of Molėtai during World War II, at Yad Vashem website.

 
Cities in Lithuania
Cities in Utena County
Municipalities administrative centres of Lithuania
Vilnius Voivodeship
Vilensky Uyezd
Holocaust locations in Lithuania
Molėtai District Municipality